Pediasia bizonelloides is a moth in the family Crambidae. It was described by Stanisław Błeszyński in 1966. It is found in Chile.

References

Crambini
Moths described in 1966
Moths of South America
Endemic fauna of Chile